Haines Junction/Pine Lake Water Aerodrome  was located  north of Haines Junction, Yukon, Canada and was open from June until October.

References

Defunct seaplane bases in Yukon